The  is a primary school in Gelsenkirchen, North Rhine-Westphalia, Germany.

After having been destroyed in World War II the school was rebuilt in the 1950s. In 1963 the school got a gym and an indoor pool. On the schoolyard was built a mini-soccerfield in the year 2008.

References

External links 
 Official website of the  

Schools in North Rhine-Westphalia
Buildings and structures in Gelsenkirchen
Educational institutions established in 1913
1913 establishments in Germany
School buildings completed in 1913